Celliers is a surname. Notable people with the surname include:

Grant Celliers (born 1978), South African cricketer
Jan Celliers (1861-1931), Anglo-Boer War general
Jan F. E. Celliers (1865–1940), South African poet, essayist, dramatist, and reviewer

See also
Cellier